These 287 species belong to the genus of rove beetles, Platydracus.

Platydracus species

 Platydracus acupunctipennis (Bernhauer, 1907)
 Platydracus aeneipennis (Cameron, 1930)
 Platydracus aeneoacreus (Cameron, 1930)
 Platydracus aeneoniger (Bernhauer, 1933)
 Platydracus afer (Erichson, 1839)
 Platydracus affinis (Solsky, 1868)
 Platydracus allardi Levasseur, 1967
 Platydracus alluaudi (Fauvel, 1905)
 Platydracus amamiensis Ito & T., 1982
 Platydracus amazonicus (Sharp, 1876)
 Platydracus angusticeps (Sharp, 1884)
 Platydracus antiquus (Nordmann, 1837)
 Platydracus apicipennis (Sharp, 1884)
 Platydracus asemus (Kraatz, 1859)
 Platydracus associatus (Cameron, 1937)
 Platydracus aureofasciatus (Motschulsky, 1861)
 Platydracus aurichalceus (Cameron, 1941)
 Platydracus auricomus (Cameron, 1929)
 Platydracus aurifluus (Erichson, 1839)
 Platydracus auroaeneus (Cameron, 1938)
 Platydracus auronotatus (Fauvel, 1895)
 Platydracus auropubescens (Cameron, 1930)
 Platydracus bakeri (Bernhauer, 1915)
 Platydracus basicornis (Fauvel, 1895)
 Platydracus becquarti (Bernhauer, 1938)
 Platydracus belti (Sharp, 1884)
 Platydracus bengalensis (Bernhauer, 1914)
 Platydracus biguttatus (Bernhauer, 1937)
 Platydracus birmanus (Fauvel, 1895)
 Platydracus biseriatus (Sharp, 1884)
 Platydracus bocandei (Fagel, 1951)
 Platydracus bodongi (Bernhauer, 1906)
 Platydracus bolivianus (Bernhauer, 1908)
 Platydracus borneensis Rougemont, 2015
 Platydracus brachycerus Smetana & Davies, 2000
 Platydracus bredoi (Fagel, 1950)
 Platydracus brevicornis (Motschulsky, 1861)
 Platydracus brevipennis Smetana & Davies, 2000
 Platydracus brincki (Scheerpeltz, 1974)
 Platydracus bruchi (Bernhauer, 1934)
 Platydracus bryanti (Cameron, 1918)
 Platydracus buquetii (Laporte de Castelnau, 1835)
 Platydracus burgeoni (Bernhauer, 1932)
 Platydracus caffer (Boheman, 1848)
 Platydracus caliginosus 
 Platydracus campestris Coiffait, 1977
 Platydracus cantharophagus (Fagel, 1950)
 Platydracus castaneus (Nordmann, 1837)
 Platydracus catalonicus Coiffait, 1967
 Platydracus centralis (Sharp, 1884)
 Platydracus cerdo (Gerstaecker, 1867)
 Platydracus cervinipennis (G.Quedenfeldt, 1888)
 Platydracus chalcescens (Sharp, 1889)
 Platydracus chalceus (Bernhauer, 1911)
 Platydracus chalcocephalus (Fabricius, 1801)
 Platydracus championi (Sharp, 1884)
 Platydracus chinensis (Bernhauer, 1914)
 Platydracus chiriquensis (Sharp, 1884)
 Platydracus chrysaster (Erichson, 1839)
 Platydracus chrysis (Bernhauer, 1936)
 Platydracus chrysotrichopterus (Scheerpeltz, 1933)
 Platydracus cincticollis (Cameron, 1951)
 Platydracus cinnamopterus (Gravenhorst, 1802)
 Platydracus circumcinctus (Bernhauer, 1914)
 Platydracus coeruleipennis Coiffait, 1983
 Platydracus collaris Coiffait, 1977
 Platydracus comes (LeConte & J.L., 1863)
 Platydracus consularis (Bernhauer, 1915)
 Platydracus contiguus (Cameron, 1938)
 Platydracus cordilleranus (Bernhauer, 1917)
 Platydracus costaricensis (Bernhauer, 1917)
 Platydracus cribratipennis (É.Blanchard, 1842)
 Platydracus cupreicollis (Nordmann, 1837)
 Platydracus curticornis (Fauvel, 1895)
 Platydracus cyaneus (Sharp, 1884)
 Platydracus cyanomelas (Erichson, 1839)
 Platydracus darfourensis Levasseur, 1967
 Platydracus dauricus (Mannerheim, 1830)
 Platydracus decipiens (Kraatz, 1859)
 Platydracus demissus (G.Müller, 1925)
 Platydracus dimidiatus (Laporte de Castelnau, 1835)
 Platydracus discretus (Sharp, 1884)
 Platydracus dispersus (Fauvel, 1907)
 Platydracus dohertyi (Cameron, 1932)
 Platydracus donnyi Rougemont, 2015
 Platydracus drescheri (Cameron, 1937)
 Platydracus dudgeoni (Cameron, 1932)
 Platydracus emeritus (Herman, 2001)
 Platydracus erichsoni (Boheman, 1848)
 Platydracus ertli (Bernhauer, 1908)
 Platydracus erythrocnemus (Nordmann, 1837)
 Platydracus evansi (Bernhauer, 1936)
 Platydracus exulans (Erichson, 1839)
 Platydracus falcimaculatus (Bernhauer, 1937)
 Platydracus fassli (Bernhauer, 1908)
 Platydracus fauvelianus (Fagel, 1950)
 Platydracus fauvelides Newton, 2017
 Platydracus feae (Bernhauer, 1915)
 Platydracus femoratus (Fabricius, 1801)
 Platydracus ferox (Nordmann, 1837)
 Platydracus fervidus (Sharp, 1884)
 Platydracus flavopilosus (Cameron, 1932)
 Platydracus flavopunctatus (Latreille, 1804)
 Platydracus formosae (Bernhauer, 1933)
 Platydracus fossator (Gravenhorst, 1802)  (red-spotted rove beetle)
 Platydracus fraternus (Bernhauer, 1915)
 Platydracus fulvipes (Scopoli, 1763)
 Platydracus fulvomaculatus (Nordmann, 1837)
 Platydracus funebris (Sharp, 1884)
 Platydracus fuscolineatus (Bernhauer, 1934)
 Platydracus fuscomaculatus (Laporte de Castelnau, 1835)
 Platydracus gabiruensis (Bernhauer, 1934)
 Platydracus gemmatus (Fauvel, 1895)
 Platydracus gentilis (Erichson, 1839)
 Platydracus gerardi (Bondroit, 1913)
 Platydracus giganteus (Kraatz, 1899)
 Platydracus girardi Levasseur, 1980
 Platydracus gmelini (Blackwelder, 1944)
 Platydracus goliathus (Bernhauer, 1912)
 Platydracus goryi (Laporte de Castelnau, 1835)
 Platydracus gracilipes (Sharp, 1884)
 Platydracus gratiosus (Sharp, 1876)
 Platydracus gratus (Sharp, 1876)
 Platydracus gravenhorsti (Blackwelder, 1944)
 Platydracus guineensis (Cameron, 1950)
 Platydracus hauserianus (Bernhauer, 1933)
 Platydracus hewitti (Bernhauer, 1914)
 Platydracus hypocrita (G.Müller, 1925)
 Platydracus immaculatus (Mannerheim, 1830)
 Platydracus imperatorius (Bernhauer, 1916)
 Platydracus impotens (Eppelsheim, 1889)
 Platydracus incognitus (Sharp, 1884)
 Platydracus inornatus (Sharp, 1874)
 Platydracus insolitus (Sharp, 1884)
 Platydracus insularis (Cameron, 1941)
 Platydracus iridiventris (Bernhauer, 1936)
 Platydracus iringanus (Bernhauer, 1937)
 Platydracus javanus (Bernhauer, 1934)
 Platydracus jeanneli (Chapman, 1939)
 Platydracus juang Smetana, 2005
 Platydracus kalisi (Bernhauer, 1934)
 Platydracus kamerunensis (Bernhauer, 1912)
 Platydracus kasyi (Scheerpeltz, 1962)
 Platydracus kiulungensis (Bernhauer, 1933)
 Platydracus kiushiuensis (Bernhauer, 1939)
 Platydracus kraatzi (Bernhauer, 1906)
 Platydracus krejcii (Coiffait, 1984)
 Platydracus kristenseni (Bernhauer, 1915)
 Platydracus lamottei Levasseur, 1967
 Platydracus lamtoensis Levasseur, 1967
 Platydracus langei (Bernhauer, 1904)
 Platydracus latebricola (Gravenhorst, 1806)
 Platydracus latecarinatus (Bernhauer, 1937)
 Platydracus latro (Erichson, 1839)
 Platydracus lecordieri Levasseur, 1980
 Platydracus lefevrei (Bernhauer, 1936)
 Platydracus leleupi Fagel, 1957
 Platydracus lewisi (Cameron, 1932)
 Platydracus lomii (Cerruti, 1951)
 Platydracus luzonicus (Fauvel, 1886)
 Platydracus maculicollis (Fauvel, 1895)
 Platydracus maculipennis (Kraatz, 1859)
 Platydracus maculosus (Gravenhorst, 1802)
 Platydracus marginatus (Cameron, 1944)
 Platydracus marmorellus (Fauvel, 1895)
 Platydracus masumotoi Y.Hayashi, 2011
 Platydracus mendicus (Sharp, 1884)
 Platydracus meridionalis (Rosenhauer, 1847)
 Platydracus methneri (Bernhauer, 1915)
 Platydracus methnerianus (Bernhauer, 1936)
 Platydracus mexicanus (Sharp, 1884)
 Platydracus mimeticus (Bernhauer, 1917)
 Platydracus mirandus (Bernhauer, 1934)
 Platydracus mongendensis (Bernhauer, 1929)
 Platydracus montanides Newton, 2015
 Platydracus montanus (Cameron, 1942)
 Platydracus mortuorum (Bernhauer, 1912)
 Platydracus muellerianus (Scheerpeltz, 1933)
 Platydracus musonoiensis Levasseur, 1967
 Platydracus mysticus (Erichson, 1840)
 Platydracus nepalensis (Scheerpeltz, 1976)
 Platydracus nigripennis (Cameron, 1941)
 Platydracus nigriventris (Boheman, 1848)
 Platydracus nobilis (Nordmann, 1837)
 Platydracus notativentris (Fauvel, 1905)
 Platydracus notatus (Solsky, 1872)
 Platydracus nudicollis (Sharp, 1887)
 Platydracus oblongopunctatus Rougemont, 2015
 Platydracus obsoleticornis (Bernhauer, 1911)
 Platydracus ochropygus (Nordmann, 1837)
 Platydracus oculosus Smetana & Davies, 2000
 Platydracus opaciceps (Scheerpeltz, 1976)
 Platydracus opacus (Roth, 1851)
 Platydracus optatus (Sharp, 1884)
 Platydracus orizabae (Bernhauer, 1917)
 Platydracus osculatii (Guérin-Méneville, 1855)
 Platydracus pallidipes (Bernhauer, 1917)
 Platydracus panamensis (Bernhauer & K.Schubert, 1914)
 Platydracus parviceps (Sharp, 1876)
 Platydracus parvulus Smetana & Davies, 2000
 Platydracus patricius (Bernhauer, 1915)
 Platydracus perniger (Scheerpeltz, 1976)
 Platydracus perreaui Coiffait, 1984
 Platydracus peyrierasi Jarrige, 1972
 Platydracus philippinus (Cameron, 1941)
 Platydracus phoenicurus (Nordmann, 1837)
 Platydracus pictus (Boheman, 1860)
 Platydracus pinorum (Casey, 1915)
 Platydracus plagiicollis (Fairmaire, 1891)
 Platydracus plebejus (Bernhauer, 1915)
 Platydracus praelongus (Mannerheim, 1830)
 Platydracus praetermissus Newton, 2011
 Platydracus prasinivariegatus (Bernhauer, 1921)
 Platydracus pratti (Scheerpeltz, 1962)
 Platydracus preangeranus (Cameron, 1937)
 Platydracus procerus (Gahan, 1893)
 Platydracus pseudopaganus (Bernhauer, 1914)
 Platydracus pulcherrimus (Bernhauer, 1915)
 Platydracus purpurascens (Cameron, 1920)
 Platydracus purpureoaureus (Bernhauer, 1915)
 Platydracus raffrayi (Fauvel, 1907)
 Platydracus reitterianus (Bernhauer, 1933)
 Platydracus rhodesianus (Cameron, 1951)
 Platydracus riojanus Hozman, 1977
 Platydracus ruandae (Bernhauer, 1934)
 Platydracus rufipennis (Cameron, 1930)
 Platydracus rufulus Rougemont, 2015
 Platydracus rugosipennis (K.Schubert, 1911)
 Platydracus rutilicauda (Horn, 1879)
 Platydracus sachalinensis (Matsumura, 1911)
 Platydracus sallaei (Sharp, 1884)
 Platydracus santacoffiensis Levasseur, 1968
 Platydracus scabrosus (Curtis, 1839)
 Platydracus schultzei (Bernhauer, 1915)
 Platydracus scriptus (Nordmann, 1837)
 Platydracus semiauratus (K.Schubert, 1911)
 Platydracus semicyaneus (Bernhauer, 1915)
 Platydracus semipurpureus (Kraatz, 1859)
 Platydracus semiviolaceus (Cameron, 1932)
 Platydracus semotus (Herman, 2001)
 Platydracus sepulchralis (Erichson, 1839)
 Platydracus sharpi (Fauvel, 1901)
 Platydracus sjostedti (Fauvel, 1903)
 Platydracus sladeae Rougemont, 2015
 Platydracus solwezianus (Cameron, 1951)
 Platydracus sparsus (Cameron, 1932)
 Platydracus speculifrons (Bernhauer, 1939)
 Platydracus stercorarius (Olivier & A.G., 1795)
 Platydracus subaeneipennis (Scheerpeltz, 1976)
 Platydracus subaeneus (Roth, 1851)
 Platydracus subauronotatus Coiffait, 1977
 Platydracus subchalceus (Cameron, 1930)
 Platydracus subirideus (Kraatz, 1859)
 Platydracus submarmorellus (K.Schubert, 1908)
 Platydracus subtilicornis Fagel, 1957
 Platydracus subviridis (Bernhauer, 1933)
 Platydracus sumakowi (Bernhauer, 1911)
 Platydracus surdus Fagel, 1957
 Platydracus suspectus (Fauvel, 1904)
 Platydracus suspiciosus (Cameron, 1937)
 Platydracus tanalensis (Fauvel, 1905)
 Platydracus tarsalis (Mannerheim, 1843)
 Platydracus temporalis (Casey, 1915)
 Platydracus tomentosus 
 Platydracus toumodiensis Levasseur, 1967
 Platydracus trimaculatus (Fauvel, 1895)
 Platydracus uheheanus (Bernhauer, 1937)
 Platydracus ussuriensis (Solsky, 1871)
 Platydracus vestitus (Sharp, 1884)
 Platydracus vetustus (Sharp, 1876)
 Platydracus vicarius (Sharp, 1889)
 Platydracus villanuevai Rougemont, 2015
 Platydracus violaceovirens (Fauvel, 1905)
 Platydracus violaceus 
 Platydracus virgulatus (Fauvel, 1895)
 Platydracus viridanus (Horn, 1879)
 Platydracus vittatus 
 Platydracus vividus (Sharp, 1884)
 Platydracus weingaertneri (Bernhauer, 1927)
 Platydracus wittei (Fagel, 1950)
 Platydracus wittmeri Coiffait, 1977
 Platydracus yolensis (Cerruti, 1951)
 Platydracus yunnanensis (Bernhauer, 1933)
 Platydracus yunnanicus Smetana & Davies, 2000
 Platydracus zavattarii (Gridelli, 1939)
 Platydracus zonatus (Gravenhorst, 1802)
 † Platydracus breviantennatus Cai, Chenyang, Newton, Diying Huang & Liang Tang, 2014

References

Platydracus